Senator Engstrom may refer to:

Elton Engstrom Jr. (1935–2013), Alaska State Senate
Elton Engstrom Sr. (1905–1963), Alaska State Senate